Rumbia may refer to:
 Rumbia LRT station in Singapore

See also
 List of tropical storms named Rumbia